The Haverhill Street Milestone is a historic milestone on Haverhill Street in Reading, Massachusetts. It is marked "B / 12 / M", denoting the distance along what was historically the post road between Boston and Haverhill. Similar markers are found in neighboring Wakefield.

The marker was added to the National Register of Historic Places in 1985.

See also
1767 Milestones
National Register of Historic Places listings in Reading, Massachusetts
National Register of Historic Places listings in Middlesex County, Massachusetts

References

Geography of Middlesex County, Massachusetts
Milestones
National Register of Historic Places in Reading, Massachusetts
Reading, Massachusetts
Transportation in Middlesex County, Massachusetts